"Wired for Sound" is a song recorded by English singer Cliff Richard, released in 1981 as the lead single for his album of the same name. The song reached number 4 in the UK Singles Chart and was certified silver by the BPI for sales over 250,000. The song reached number 2 in Australia and South Africa, and was a hit in a number of European countries. The song was written by Alan Tarney and B.A. Robertson.

A live version of the song was released in 1990 as an extra track on Richard's CD and 12" single of "From a Distance".

The music video was filmed at Milton Keynes Shopping Centre.

Chart performance and certifications

Weekly charts

Year-end charts

Certifications

Covers
In May 2000, Australian duo B(if)tek featuring Julee Cruise released an electronic music cover version as a single from their album 2020. It reached number 82 in the Australian charts.

References

External links
 

1981 singles
1981 songs
Cliff Richard songs
Songs written by Alan Tarney
Songs written by BA Robertson
Song recordings produced by Alan Tarney
EMI Records singles